Auersberg may refer to:
 Auersberg, a mountain in the Saxon Ore Mountains near Wildenthal, Germany
 Two mountains in the Bavarian Rhön, the Großer Auersberg and Kleiner Auersberg, in the Wildflecken Training Area, Germany
 Auersberg (Hilders), a mountain in the Hessian Rhön north of Hilders, Germany
 Auersberg, a German cargo ship of the Type RO 15